Brongnartia can refer to:

 Brongniartia (plant), a genus of leguminous plant, family Fabaceae
 Brongniartia (beetle), a genus of beetle, family Elateridae
 Brongniartia (trilobite), a genus of trilobite
 Brongniartia isotelea, a junior synonym of the trilobite Isotelus gigas
 Brongniartia trilobitoides, a former name of the Antarctic crustacean Serolis trilobitoides

See also

 
 
 Brongniart (surname)
 Brongniartieae (plant tribus), the tribe clade that the plant genus Brongniartia belongs